This list presents female speakers of national and territorial unicameral parliaments of their respective nations or territories. Many women have been elected to parliaments around the world, starting around the first quarter of 20th century. Some of them were entrusted to take the position of Speaker of the parliament. 

In government, unicameralism (Latin uni, one + camera, chamber) is the practice of having one legislative or parliamentary chamber. Thus, a unicameral parliament or unicameral legislature is a legislature which consists of one chamber or house. Unicameral legislatures typically exist in small and homogeneous unitary states, where a second chamber is considered unnecessary.

National 

Italics denotes an acting speaker of parliament and states that are either de facto (with limited to no international recognition) or defunct.

Notes:

Territorial

Italics denotes an acting speaker of parliament

See also
List of female speakers of national and territorial lower houses
List of female speakers of national and territorial upper houses
List of current presidents of legislatures
Parliament
Speaker (politics)
Unicameralism

References

External links
http://guide2womenleaders.com/Vice-Presidents.htm

 
Speakers, Unicameral parliament
Speakers, Unicameral parliament
Speakers, Unicameral parliament
Female